Harrison is an unincorporated community in southeastern Fayette Township, Vigo County, in the U.S. state of Indiana.

It is part of the Terre Haute metropolitan area.

History
Harrison was platted August 4, 1837, by Ann Potts, on the west side of the river from Fort Harrison, a military outpost in the region built in 1811 by General William Henry Harrison.

Geography

References

Unincorporated communities in Indiana
Unincorporated communities in Vigo County, Indiana
Terre Haute metropolitan area